Bernard VII, Count of Armagnac (1360 – 12 June 1418) was Count of Armagnac and Constable of France. He was the son of John II, Count of Armagnac, and Jeanne de Périgord. He succeeded in Armagnac at the death of his brother, John III, in 1391. After prolonged fighting, he also became Count of Comminges in 1412.

When his brother, who claimed the Kingdom of Majorca, invaded northern Catalonia late in 1389 in an attempt to seize the kingdom's continental possessions (the County of Roussillon), Bernard commanded part of his forces.

Bernard's wife was Bonne, the daughter of John, Duke of Berry, and widow of Count Amadeus VII, Count of Savoy. He first gained influence at the French court when Louis, Duke of Orléans married Valentina Visconti, the daughter of Gian Galeazzo Visconti, Duke of Milan. Bernard's sister Beatrice married Valentina's brother Carlo.

After Louis' assassination in 1407, Armagnac remained attached to the cause of Orléans. He married his daughter Bonne to the young Charles, Duke of Orléans in 1410. Bernard d'Armagnac became the nominal head of the faction which opposed John the Fearless in the Armagnac–Burgundian Civil War, and the faction came to be called the "Armagnacs" as a consequence.

He became constable of France in 1415 and was the head of the government of the Dauphin, the future Charles VII, until the Burgundians invaded Paris in the night of 28–29 May 1418. On 12 June 1418, he was one of the first victims of the massacres in which anywhere between 1,000 and 5,000 of his real or suspected followers were killed in the course of weeks throughout the summer.

Children
With Bonne of Berry, they had:
 John IV, Count of Armagnac, married 1) Blanche of Brittany and 2) Isabella of Navarre
 Anne of Armagnac, married Charles II of Albret
 Bonne of Armagnac, married Charles, Duke of Orléans
 Bernard, Count of Pardiac, married Eleanor, heiress to La Marche

References

Sources

209

External links
 -Family tree from the Medieval Lands Project
 The Households of the Counts of Armagnac in the Late Middle Ages - abstract of a paper analyzing the household expenses of Count Bernard VII, from the Société Internationale des Médiévistes.

|-

|-

|-

Bernard VII, Count of Armagnac
Bernard VII, Count of Armagnac
Armagnac, Bernard VII
Bernard VII, Count of Armagnac
Armagnac, Bernard VII, Count of
People of the Hundred Years' War